Sphenomorphus minutus  is a species of skink found in Indonesia.

References

minutus
Reptiles described in 1874
Taxa named by Adolf Bernhard Meyer
Skinks of New Guinea